The Lockheed L-188 Electra is an American turboprop airliner built by Lockheed. First flown in 1957, it was the first large turboprop airliner built in the United States. Initial sales were good, but after two fatal crashes that led to expensive modifications to fix a design defect, no more were ordered. With its unique high power-to-weight ratio, huge propellers and very short wings (resulting in the majority of the wingspan being enveloped in propwash), large Fowler flaps which significantly increased effective wing area when extended, and four-engined design, the airplane had airfield performance capabilities unmatched by many jet transport aircraft even today—particularly on short runways and high field elevations. Jet airliners soon supplanted turboprops for many purposes, and many Electras were modified as freighters. Some Electras are still being used in various roles into the 21st century. The airframe was also used as the basis for the Lockheed P-3 Orion maritime patrol aircraft.

Development
By mid-20th century, Lockheed had established a strong position in commercial airliner production with its piston-engined Constellation series. Further development brought turboprop engines to the Constellation airframe with the Lockheed L-1249 Super Constellation.

In 1951, Lockheed was approached by Capital Airlines to develop a new turboprop airliner, which was designated the YC-130, but no other carriers had any interest, so the design was dropped. Subsequently, Capital Airlines went on to order 60 British Vickers Viscounts. In 1954, as a result of American Airlines' interest in developing a twin-engined aircraft, the idea resurfaced and the company offered a twin-engined design now designated the CL-303. This newer design was a high-wing type and would allow for 60 to 70 passengers. This design was also shelved for lack of interest from other carriers.

The following year, American Airlines revised its requirement to a four-engine design for 75 passengers with  range. Lockheed proposed a new design, the CL-310 with a low wing and four Rolls-Royce Darts or Napier Elands. The CL-310 design met the American Airlines requirements, but failed to meet those of another interested carrier, Eastern Air Lines. Lockheed redesigned the CL-310 to use the Allison 501-D13 turboprop engine, a civilian version of the T56 developed for the Lockheed C-130 Hercules military transport. The airframe was stretched to allow for more seats and handle the increased performance. This design was launched as the Model 188 with an order for 35 by American Airlines on June 8, 1955. This was followed by Eastern Air Lines with an order for 40 on September 27, 1955. The first aircraft took 26 months to complete, and by that time Lockheed had orders for 129. The prototype, a Model 188A, first flew on December 6, 1957, two months ahead of schedule. Lockheed was awarded a type certificate by the Civil Aeronautics Administration (CAA) on 22 August 1958. The first delivery – to Eastern Air Lines – was on October 8, 1958, but it did not enter service until January 12, 1959.

In 1957, the United States Navy issued a requirement for an advanced maritime patrol aircraft. Lockheed proposed a development of the Electra that was later placed into production as the P-3 Orion, which had much greater success — the Orion has been in continual front-line service for more than 50 years.

Design
The Model 188 Electra is a low-wing cantilever monoplane powered by four wing-mounted Allison 501-D13 turboprops. It has a retractable tricycle landing gear and a conventional tail. It has a cockpit crew of three and can carry 66 to 80 passengers in a mixed-class arrangement, although 98 could be carried in a high-density layout. The first variant was the Model 188A, followed by the longer-range 188C with room for  more fuel and maximum take-off weight  higher.

Operational history

Civilian operations
American Airlines was the launch customer. Eastern Air Lines, Braniff Airways, and Northwest Airlines followed. The Electra suffered a troubled start. Passengers of early aircraft complained of noise in the cabin forward of the wings, caused by propeller resonance. Lockheed redesigned the engine nacelles, tilting the engines upwards 3°. The changes were incorporated on the production line by mid-1959 or as modification kits for the aircraft already built, and resulted in improved performance and a better ride for passengers.

Three aircraft were lost in fatal accidents between February 1959 and March 1960. After the third crash, the FAA limited the Electra's speed until the cause could be determined. After an extensive investigation, two of the crashes (in September 1959 and March 1960) were found to be caused by an engine-mount problem. The mounting of the gearbox cracked, and the reduced rigidity enabled a phenomenon called "whirl mode flutter" (analogous to the precession of a child's top as it slows down, an interaction of propellers with airflow) that affected the outboard engine nacelles. When the oscillation was transmitted to the wings and the flutter frequency decreased to a point where it was resonant with the outer wing panels (at the same frequency, or harmonically related ones), violent up-and-down oscillation increased until the wings would tear off.

The company implemented an expensive modification program (the Lockheed Electra Achievement Program, LEAP) in which the engine mounts and the wing structures supporting the mounts were strengthened, and some of the wing skins were replaced with thicker material. All Electras were modified at Lockheed's expense at the factory, with the modifications taking 20 days for each aircraft. The changes were incorporated in later aircraft as they were built. However, the damage had been done, and the public lost confidence in the type. This and the smaller jets that were being introduced eventually relegated Electras to the smallest airlines. Production ended in 1961 after 170 had been built. Losses to Lockheed have been estimated as high as $57 million, not counting an additional $55 million in lawsuits. Electras continued to carry passengers into the 1980s, but most now in use are freighters.

Several airlines in the US flew Electras, but the only European airline to order the type from Lockheed was KLM, which used 12 between September 1959 and January 1969 in Europe and east to Saigon and Kuala Lumpur.

In the South Pacific, Tasman Empire Airways Limited (TEAL) and its successor Air New Zealand flew the Electra on trans-Tasman flights. In Australia Trans Australia Airlines (TAA) and Ansett each operated three Electras on trunk routes between the Australian mainland state capital cities, and later to Port Moresby, from 1959 until 1971. Ansett had its three Electras converted to freighters in 1970–71 and continued to fly them until 1984. Qantas also operated four Electras on its routes to Hong Kong and Japan, to New Caledonia, and to New Guinea (until the New Guinea route was handed to Ansett and TAA); then later across the Indian Ocean to South Africa, and across the Tasman in competition with TEAL after that airline became 100% New Zealand-owned. The divestiture of TEAL's 50%-Australian shareholding was itself prompted by the Electra order, as TEAL wanted jet aircraft, but was forced by the Australian government to order Electras in order to standardise with Qantas. Three Qantas Electras were retired in the mid-1960s and the fourth in 1971.

Some Electras were sold to South American airlines, where the Electra had highly successful operations, such as those of Lloyd Aéreo Boliviano and Líneas Aéreas Paraguayas; in both cases, the Electra ensured the airlines' international operations before they started using jets. Most notably, Brazilian flag carrier airline Varig operated flawlessly a fleet of 14 Electras on the extremely busy Rio de Janeiro-São Paulo shuttle service (the so-called Ponte Aérea - or "Air Bridge" in Portuguese) for 30 years, completing over half a million flights on the route before the type was replaced by Boeing 737-300 and Fokker 100 jets in 1992. The Electra became so iconic on that route that its retirement caused a commotion in Brazil, with extensive press coverage and many special tributes.

During the mid-1970s, several secondhand Electras were bought by travel clubs, including Adventurers and Shillelaghs. Others were retired from passenger service into air-cargo use, 40 being modified by a subsidiary of Lockheed from 1968 with one or two large doors in the left side of the fuselage and a reinforced cabin floor. Air California and Pacific Southwest Airlines (PSA) were still operating Electras for scheduled passenger service during the late 1970s primarily into the Lake Tahoe Airport located in the Sierra Nevada mountains of California, as this airfield had banned scheduled jet aircraft flights at the time.

Military use
In 1973, the Argentine Navy bought three Electras equipped with cargo doors. These were used during the "Dirty War" to toss political prisoners into the Rio de La Plata in the infamous death flights. The Electras were also used for transport duties during the Falklands War in 1982.

In 1983, after the retirement of its last SP-2H Neptune, the Argentine Navy bought further civilian Electra airframes, modified several for maritime patrol, and widely used them until their replacement by P-3s in 1994. One of the Argentine Navy's Electras, known locally as L-188E Electron, is preserved at the Argentine Naval Aviation Museum (Museo de la Aviación Naval) at Bahía Blanca.

Variants

Initial production version
L-188AF (All Freight version)
Unofficial designation for freighter conversions of L-188A carried out under a supplementary type certificate.
L-188PF (Passenger-Freight version)
Unofficial designation for freighter conversions of L-188A carried out under a supplementary type certificate.

L-188CF
Unofficial designation for freighter conversion of L-188C carried out under a supplementary type certificate.
YP-3A Orion

Operators

Current operators
As of July 2018, only two Electras remain in active airliner service. Other aircraft are in service as air tankers and cargo aircraft as follows:

Canada
Air Spray (aerial firefighting) fourteen registered with nine in active service as air tankers;
Buffalo Airways (cargo/bulk fuel and aerial firefighting) shows eight registered with four in active service (two used for Cargo/Bulk Fuel Transport and two as air tankers)
Conair Group (aerial firefighting) with one registered in active service as an air tanker.

Former civilian operators

Australia
Ansett Airlines
Qantas
Trans Australia Airlines
Austria
Amerer Air
Bolivia
Lloyd Aéreo Boliviano
Brazil
Varig
Canada
International Jetair
Northwest Territorial Airways
Nordair 1972–1987 (Canadian Airlines 1987–1989) - 4 operated for Transport Canada Ice Reconnaissance service 1970s–1989
Colombia
SAM Colombia
Aerocondor Colombia
Aerocosta
Republic of the Congo
Trans Service Airlift
Costa Rica
Aero Servicios Puntarenas SA (APSA)
Lacsa
Ecuador
Ecuatoriana de Aviación
Transportes Aereos Nacionales Ecuatorianos (TAME)
El Salvador
TACA International Airlines
Guyana
Guyana Airways
Honduras
SAHSA
Transportes Aereos Nacionales (TAN Airlines)
Hong Kong
Cathay Pacific Airways

Indonesia
Garuda Indonesia Airlines
Mandala Airlines
Ireland
Hunting Cargo Airlines
Laos
Royal Air Lao
Mexico
Banco de México (corporate aircraft)
Mex-Jet Cargo (all cargo freighter version)
Netherlands
KLM
Martinair
Netherlands Antilles
Air ALM (all cargo freighter version)
Norway
Fred. Olsen Airtransport
Nordic Air
New Zealand
Air New Zealand
TEAL
Panama
Copa Airlines 
Paraguay
 Líneas Aéreas Paraguayas
Peru
 Líneas Aéreas Nacionales SA
Philippines
 Air Manila International
Sweden
Falcon Air
West Air Sweden
Taiwan
 Winner Airways (one L-188A leased from Eastern Air Lines for two months in 1970)

United Kingdom
Air Bridge Carriers
Atlantic Airlines
Channel Express
United States
Air California
Air Florida
Air Southwest
American Airlines
American Flyers Airline
Braniff International Airways
Denver Ports of Call
Eastern Air Lines
Evergreen International Airlines
Federal Aviation Administration
Fairbanks Air Service
Great Northern Airlines
Gulf Air Transport  
Hawaiian Airlines (all cargo freighter versions)
Holiday Airlines
Intermountain Airlines
Johnson International Airlines
McCulloch International Airlines
NASA
National Airlines
National Center for Atmospheric Research
Northwest Airlines
Overseas National Airways
Pacific Southwest Airlines
Reeve Aleutian Airways (passenger/cargo "Combi" versions) 
Renown Aviation
Saturn Airways
Shillelagh Travel Club
Southeast Airlines
Trans International Airlines, later became Transamerica Airlines
TPI International Airways
Western Airlines
Zantop International Airlines
Zaire
Karibu Airways
Trans Service Airlift

Military operators
Argentina
Argentine Naval Aviation
Bolivia
Bolivian Air Force - 1 from 1973, still in use in 1987.
Ecuador
TAME
Honduras
Honduran Air Force - one 188A from 1979
Mexico
Mexican Air Force - one 188A from 1978 to 1987.
Panama
Panamanian Air Force - One 188C from 1973 to 1984.

Orders
Model 188A
 Eastern Air Lines ordered 40 188As which were delivered between November 1958 and August 1959, the last five as 188Cs.
 American Airlines ordered 35 188As which were delivered between November 1958 and March 1960.
 National Airlines ordered 14 188As which were delivered between April 1959 and January 1961.
 Ansett-ANA ordered three 188As which were delivered to Australia in February 1959, April 1959 and February 1960.
 Braniff ordered nine 188As which were delivered between April 1959 and January 1960.
 Western Airlines ordered 12 188As which were delivered between May 1959 and February 1961.
 Cathay Pacific ordered two 188As which were delivered in 1959.
 Trans Australia Airlines ordered three 188As which were delivered to Australia between June 1959 and August 1960.
 General Motors ordered one 188A which was delivered in July 1958.

Model 188C
 Northwest Orient Airlines ordered 18 188Cs which were delivered between July 1959 and June 1961.
 Pacific Southwest Airlines ordered three 188Cs which were delivered in November and December 1959.
 Capital Airlines ordered five 188Cs but later cancelled the order. The five aircraft were sold to other operators.
 Qantas  ordered four 188Cs which were delivered between October and December 1959.
 KLM ordered 12 188Cs which were delivered between September 1959 and December 1960.
 Tasman Empire Airways ordered three 188Cs which were delivered in October and December 1959.
 Garuda ordered three 188Cs which were delivered in January 1961.

Aircraft on display
s/no. 1003 ex NASA N428NA. This was the first P-3 Orion prototype. It was converted from an existing L188 Electra airframe into the YP3V-1/YP-3A Orion. It was later converted into the NP-3A by United States Naval Research Laboratory, then used by NASA for the Earth Resources Observation Program. Preserved at the National Naval Aviation Museum, Forrest Sherman Field, Pensacola, Florida.
s/no. 1025 ex Varig PP-VJM; preserved at the Museu Aeroespacial in Rio de Janeiro, Brazil
s/no. 1125 TAM69, in TAM – Transporte Aéreo Militar colors at the Bolivia Aeronautical Museum, El Alto, La Paz, Bolivia.
 ex Argentine Navy 6-P-104, converted to L-188EW WAVE, retired in 1996; on display at the Museo de la Aviación Naval, Bahia Blanca, Argentina.
 ex Argentine Navy 6-P-106, converted to L-188E Electron, retired in 1996; on display at the Museo de la Aviación Naval, Comandante Espora Air Naval Base, Bahia Blanca.

Accidents and incidents
Of the total of 170 Electras built, as of June 2011, 58 have been written off because of crashes and other accidents.

 February 3, 1959: American Airlines Flight 320 en route from Chicago to New York City's LaGuardia Airport crashed on approach, 65 of 73 on board died.
 September 29, 1959: A Braniff Electra (Braniff Flight 542) crashed in Buffalo, Texas, en route to Dallas, Texas from Houston, Texas. All 29 passengers and five crew members died in the crash. The Civil Aeronautics Board blamed the crash on the "whirl-mode" prop theory and in-flight separation of a wing from the aircraft.
 March 17, 1960: Northwest Orient Flight 710, en route from Chicago to Miami, Florida, broke apart in flight over Perry County, Indiana, in the second "whirl-mode" crash. All 63 people on board died (57 passengers and six crew members).
 September 14, 1960: An Electra operated as American Airlines Flight 361 caught its landing gear on a dike while landing at LaGuardia Airport. The aircraft came to rest upside down. There were no fatalities among the 76 occupants (70 passengers, six crew).
 October 4, 1960: Eastern Air Lines Flight 375 crashed on takeoff from Boston, Massachusetts's Logan International Airport; 62 of 72 on board died. The crash was eventually determined to be the result of bird ingestion into three of the four engines.
 June 12, 1961: KLM Flight 823 crashed short of the runway on approach to Cairo; 20 of the 36 on board died.
 September 17, 1961: Northwest Orient Airlines Flight 706 crashed on takeoff from Chicago-O'Hare International Airport; all 37 on board died. The crash was eventually determined to be the result of mechanical failure in the aileron primary control system due to the improper replacement of the aileron boost assembly.
 March 27, 1965: While on a training flight, a Tasman Empire Airways L-188 crashed while landing at Whenuapai airport in Auckland, New Zealand. Although the aircraft was completely destroyed, all occupants escaped with only one minor injury.
 April 22, 1966: American Flyers Airline Flight 280/D crashed into a hill on approach to Ardmore Municipal Airport in Oklahoma; all five crew and 78 of the 93 passengers on board died.
 February 16, 1967: Garuda Indonesia Airways Flight 708 crashed while attempting to land at Manado-Sam Ratulangi Airport. A total of 22 of 92 passengers and crew on board died. The crash was eventually determined to be the result of an awkward landing technique resulting in an excessive rate of sink on touchdown. Marginal weather at the time of landing was a contributing factor.
 May 3, 1968: Braniff Flight 352, en route from Houston to Dallas, disintegrated over Dawson, Texas. All 80 passengers and five crew members died. This was the deadliest aviation disaster in Texas at the time. The National Transportation Safety Board found the probable cause to be overstressing of the structure beyond its ultimate strength during attempted recovery from unusual aircraft attitude produced by turbulence of a thunderstorm.
 August 9, 1970: LANSA Flight 502 crashed shortly after takeoff from Quispiquilla Airport near Cusco, Peru; 99 of the 100 people on board, plus two people on the ground, died. The co-pilot was the only survivor.
 December 24, 1971: LANSA Flight 508, en route from Lima to Pucallpa, Peru, entered an area of strong turbulence and lightning and disintegrated in midair due to structural failure following a lightning strike and fire. Of the 92 people on board, 91 died. One passenger, Juliane Koepcke, survived when trees cushioned her fall into the rainforest.
 August 27, 1973: A Lockheed L-188A Electra passenger plane (HK-777) operated by Aerocondor was destroyed when it flew into the side of the Cerro el Cable mountain shortly after takeoff from Bogotá-Eldorado Airport (BOG), Colombia. All 36 passengers and six crew members died.
 October 30, 1974: On approach to Rea Point Airfield on Melville Island, Northwest Territories (now Nunavut), Canada, Panarctic Oils Flight 416 crashed into the ice-covered sea some 3 km south of its destination after the pilot-in-command abruptly increased the rate of descent in apparent disorientation. All 30 passengers and two of the four crew members, including the pilot-in-command, died.
 June 4, 1976: An Air Manila 188A (RP-C1061) crashed just after takeoff from the Guam Naval Air Station; the 45 occupants and one person on the ground died. 
 On November 18, 1979, Transamerica Airlines L-188 (N859U), operating a flight for the US military (Logair 3N18) from Hill Air Force Base, crashed near Salt Lake City airport, Utah.  While climbing between 12,000 and 13,000 ft, all electrical power was lost; the crew requested an immediate descent. The aircraft attained a high airspeed and a high rate of descent and the aircraft disintegrated in flight; all three crew members died. The NTSB investigation stated the probable cause was a progressive failure of the aircraft electrical system leading to the disabling or erratic performance of flight critical flight instruments and lighting. As a result, the crew became disoriented and lost control of the aircraft. The crew's efforts to regain control of the aircraft imposed loads which exceeded the design limits and caused it to break up in flight.  
On 8 June 1983, Reeve Aleutian Airways Flight 8's number-four propeller separated from the aircraft and tore a hole in the fuselage over the Pacific Ocean causing a rapid decompression and loss of control. The pilots managed to land the aircraft safely at Anchorage, Alaska and all 15 passengers and crew survived. Since the propeller fell into the sea and was never recovered, the cause of the separation is unknown.
 May 30, 1984, Zantop International Airlines Flight 931, a Lockheed L-188AF Electra (N5523) flying regularly scheduled cargo service from Baltimore/Washington International Airport (BWI) to Detroit-Willow Run Airport (YIP), crashed at Chalkhill, Pennsylvania; all three crew members and the sole passenger died. While cruising at FL220, at approximately 01:44 AM, the aircraft entered an unusual attitude shortly after a course change. During efforts to recover the aircraft the pilots imposed loads on the airframe that exceeded the aircraft's design limits and it broke apart at altitude. NTSB reported that in-flight problems with the aircraft's gyros likely provided conflicting attitude data to the flight crew at the time of the upset and this, combined with a lack of visual cues, were contributing causes of the accident.
 January 21, 1985: Chartered Galaxy Airlines Flight 203 crashed after takeoff from Reno-Cannon International Airport en route to Minneapolis/St Paul Minnesota; 70 of the 71 people on board died.
 September 12, 1988:  Tame Ecuador L-188A Electra, registration HC-AZY, crashed near Lago Agrio Airport shortly after takeoff; six crew and one passenger died .
 September 4, 1989: Tame Ecuador L-188C Electra, registration HC-AZJ, crash-landed at Taura AFB with no fatalities.
 December 18, 1995: An overloaded 188C of Trans Service Airlift crashed near Cahungula, Angola, with the loss of 141 of the 144 occupants. This is the deadliest aviation disaster involving the Lockheed L-188 Electra.
 July 16, 2003: An Air Spray Lockheed L-188 Electra (Tanker #86 C-GFQA) crashed and was destroyed near Cranbrook, British Columbia shortly after delivering the retardant load. Tanker 86 was seen to turn right initially, then entered a turn to the left. At 1221 MST, the Electra struck the terrain on the side of a steep ridge at about 3900 feet above sea level. The aircraft exploded on impact and the two pilots died. An intense post-crash fire consumed much of the wreckage and started a forest fire at the crash site and the surrounding area.

Specifications (Model 188A)

See also

References

Notes

Bibliography

 "2010 World Airliner Census". Flight International, August 24–30, 2010, pp. 29–49.
 "2011 World Airliner Census". Flight International
 "Air Commerce: The New York Tragedy". Flight, February 13, 1959, p. 231.
 Allen, Eric. Airliners in Australian Service, Volume 1. Weston Creek ACT: Aerospace Publications, 1995. .
 Brimson, Samuel. Flying the Royal Mail: The History of Australia's Airlines. Sydney, Australia: Dreamweaver Books, 1984. .
 Eastwood, Tony and John Roach. Turbo Prop Airliner Production List. West Drayton, Middlesex, UK: The Aviation Hobby Shop, 1990. .
 .
 Francillon, René J. Lockheed Aircraft since 1913. London: Putnam, 1982. .
 Hagby, Kay. Fra Nielsen & Winther til Boeing 747  (in Norwegian).  Drammen, Norway. Hagby, 1998.  .
 Siegrist, Martin. "Bolivian Air Power — Seventy Years On". Air International, Vol. 33, No. 4, October 1987. pp. 170–176, 194. .
 

 
 Taylor, John W. R. Jane's All the World's Aircraft 1961–62. London: Sampson Low, Marston & Company, Ltd., 1961.

Further reading

External links

 Information, Pictures and Production List
 Engineering Summary of Propeller Whirl on the Electra
 Kiwanis Electra Memorial website
 NTSB Report on 1968 Braniff N9707C Crash
 "Lockheed Electra" a 1955 Flight article

L-0188 Electra
1950s United States airliners
Four-engined tractor aircraft
Low-wing aircraft
Four-engined turboprop aircraft
 
Aircraft first flown in 1957